The Pavlenishvili (Georgian ფავლენიშვილი, Russian Павле́новы, English version Phavlenishvili, Pavlenishvili, from Pavlenichvili) is an old Georgian princely dynasty, branch of princes Mkhargrdzeli, who at their turn were descendants of the ancient Iranian House of Karen-Pahlevi house, a branch of the Parthian Arsacids.

A version tells that the root "pavleni" derives from Pahlevi.

Poet Mikhail Pavlenishvili belongs to this family.

Noble families of Georgia (country)
Nobility of Georgia (country)
Russian nobility
Georgian-language surnames